The British Independent Film Award for Best Performance by an Actor in a British Independent Film is an annual award given by the British Independent Film Awards (BIFA) to recognize the best lead performance by an actor in a British independent film. The award was first presented in the 1998 ceremony with Ray Winstone being the first recipient of the award for his performance as Raymond in Nil by Mouth.

Actors Michael Fassbender, Tom Hardy and Josh O'Connor are the only nominees who have won the award twice while Riz Ahmed holds the record of most nominations in this category with five nominations.

On July 2022, it was announced that the performance categories would be replaced with gender-neutral categories, with both Best Actor and Best Actress merging into the Best Lead Performance category. Additionally, a category named Best Joint Lead Performance was created for "two (or exceptionally three) performances that are the joint focus of the film, especially where performances share a large number of scenes and screen time".

Winners and nominees

1990s

2000s

2010s

2020s

Multiple nominations

5 nominations
 Riz Ahmed

4 nominations
 Jim Broadbent
 Michael Fassbender

3 nominations
 Paddy Considine
 Daniel Craig
 Brendan Gleeson
 Tom Hardy
 Peter Mullan
 Ray Winstone

2 nominations
 Jamie Bell
 Steve Coogan
 Colin Farrell
 Chiwetel Ejiofor
 James McAvoy
 Josh O'Connor
 Joaquin Phoenix

Multiple wins

2 wins
 Michael Fassbender
 Tom Hardy
 Josh O'Connor

See also
 Academy Award for Best Actor
 Critics' Choice Movie Award for Best Actor
 BAFTA Award for Best Actor in a Leading Role
 Golden Globe Award for Best Actor – Motion Picture Drama
 Golden Globe Award for Best Actor – Motion Picture Musical or Comedy
 Screen Actors Guild Award for Outstanding Performance by a Male Actor in a Leading Role

References

External links
 Official website

British Independent Film Awards
Film awards for lead actor